Alexander Mitchell  (1831 – 16 May 1873) was a Liberal Party politician in the United Kingdom.  He was Member of Parliament (MP) for Berwick-upon-Tweed from 1865 to 1868.

References

External links 

1831 births
1873 deaths
Liberal Party (UK) MPs for English constituencies
UK MPs 1865–1868
Presidents of the Oxford Union